The Russellville Downtown Historic District encompasses an eight-block area of downtown Russellville, Arkansas.  This area, developed primarily between 1875 and 1930, includes the city's highest concentration of period commercial architecture, a total of 34 buildings.  Most of them are brick, one or two stories in height, and in a variety of styles.  The district is roughly bounded by Arkansas and West 2nd Streets, El Paso Avenue, and the Missouri-Pacific Railroad tracks.

The district was listed on the National Register of Historic Places in 1996.

It includes:  
Pope County Courthouse (1931), 100 West Main Street, the "dominant" building in the district, a four-story brick building designed by architect H. Ray Burks in Art Deco style
Riggs-Hamilton American Legion Post No. 20 (1936), built by Works Progress Administration, separately listed on the National Register
railroad depot, separately listed on the National Register

See also
National Register of Historic Places listings in Pope County, Arkansas

References

Historic districts on the National Register of Historic Places in Arkansas
National Register of Historic Places in Pope County, Arkansas
Buildings and structures in Russellville, Arkansas
Commercial buildings completed in 1936
Commercial buildings on the National Register of Historic Places in Arkansas
Buildings designated early commercial in the National Register of Historic Places in Arkansas